Forest Hill High School is a public high school located in Jackson, Mississippi, United States. It serves students from grades 912, and is part of the Jackson Public School District. The current principal is Torrey Hampton.

Demographics
A total of 1,136 students were enrolled in Forest Hill High during the 2006–2007 school year. The gender makeup of the district was 51% female and 49% male. The racial makeup of the school was 96.39% African American, 2.90% White, 0.35% Hispanic, and 0.35% Asian.

Gifted Education/Open Doors
Gifted courses in grades 912 are offered based upon funding and teacher units provided by the state. Currently, Forest Hill High School is the only high school in the Jackson Public School District to offer gifted courses in English/language arts.

Feeder pattern
The following schools feed into Forest Hill High School.

Middle Schools
Cardozo Middle School
Elementary Schools
Bates Elementary School
Oak Forest Elementary School
Timberlawn Elementary School
Van Winkle Elementary School

Controversy
On October 5, 2018, the school's band performed at halftime in a game against Brookhaven High School, where 2 police officers were shot and killed earlier that week. The band's performance was based on the film John Q., that simulated police being shot by band members dressed as doctors and nurses. This has resulted in general outrage as the governor himself, Phil Bryant, condemned this act.

References

External links
 

Public high schools in Mississippi
Schools in Jackson, Mississippi